Manigonigo Island (variously Manigonigo Islet and called Islote de Manigonigo during Spanish rule) is an island in northeastern Iloilo, Philippines. It is one of fourteen islands politically administered by the municipality of Carles. The island's lighthouse was built by the Spanish  during Spanish rule.

Location and geography
The island is small and flat.

Lighthouse
During Spanish rule of the Philippines, the Spanish built 27 major and 33 minor lighthouses throughout the Philippines, including one on Manigonigo Island. On 6 November 1894, the Spanish government gave notice of their intent to erect a lighthouse on Manigonigo on 15 November that same year. The original tower was a steel tourelle and was prefabricated in France.

See also
 List of islands in the Philippines
 Lighthouses in the Philippines

References

External links
 Manigonigo Island at OpenStreetMap

islands of Iloilo